Edward Cornelius Reed Jr. (July 8, 1924 – June 1, 2013) was a United States district judge of the United States District Court for the District of Nevada.

Education and career

Born in Mason, Nevada, Reed received a Bachelor of Arts degree from University of Nevada, Reno in 1949. He received a Juris Doctor from Harvard Law School in 1952. He was in the United States Army from 1943 to 1946. He was a tax attorney at the firm of Arthur Andersen & Co. in Boston, Massachusetts from 1952 to 1953. He was in private practice of law in Reno, Nevada from 1953 to 1979. He was a special deputy state attorney general for water rights litigation in Nevada from 1967 to 1979.

Federal judicial service

Reed was nominated by President Jimmy Carter on April 12, 1979, to the United States District Court for the District of Nevada, to a new seat created by 92 Stat. 1629. He was confirmed by the United States Senate on September 25, 1979, and received his commission on September 26, 1979. He served as Chief Judge from 1986 to 1992. He assumed senior status on July 15, 1992, serving in that capacity until his death on June 1, 2013, in Reno.

References

Sources
 

1924 births
2013 deaths
Harvard Law School alumni
Judges of the United States District Court for the District of Nevada
Massachusetts lawyers
Military personnel from Nevada
Nevada lawyers
People from Lyon County, Nevada
Politicians from Reno, Nevada
United States district court judges appointed by Jimmy Carter
20th-century American judges
University of Nevada, Reno alumni
United States Army personnel of World War II